Alfonso de Aragón y Foix (1332 - Gandia, 5 March 1412)  also called Alfonso I of Gandía "the old" and Alfonso IV of Ribagorza, was the eldest son of Count Peter of Ribagorza and Juana of Foix. He was the grandson of James II of Aragon and cousin of Pedro IV "the Ceremonious". He held the titles of Duke of Gandía (from 1399), Count of Denia (since 1355), Count of Ribagorza (from 1361), Marquis of Villena (since 1366), and first Constable of Castile.

He was a claimant to the Crown of Aragon in the succession crisis that followed the death of Martin of Aragon with no children. Alfonso claimed the crown as senior male-line descendant of James II. Alfonso died before the crisis was resolved by the Compromise of Caspe; his claim was inherited by his brother, Juan of Aragon and Foix.

See also 
 Dukes of Gandía
 Monastery of Sant Jeroni de Cotalba

References

Bibliography 
 Iglesias Costa, Manuel (2001) Historia del condado de Ribagorza.  . Huesca: Instituto de Estudios Altoaragoneses: Diputación de Huesca. .
Suárez Fernández, Luis (1976) Historia de España Antigua y media .  vol.1, p. 318. Ediciones Rialp  .

House of Aragon
1412 deaths
1332 births
Dukes of Spain
Counts of Spain
Dukes of Gandía
Monastery of Sant Jeroni de Cotalba
Marquesses of Villena
Ribagorza